American Detective was a police documentary television series broadcast by ABC in the United States from 1991 to 1993.

American Detective features detectives in major U.S. urban areas working on high-profile criminal cases which were often drug-related.  The program often allows glimpses into the personal lives of the detectives.

During the latter part of the program's run, Lieutenant John Bunnell of the Multnomah County, Oregon Sheriff's Department, who had been featured in a number of the program's earlier shows, served in the role of host, even taking the viewers on a trip to Russia to look at his counterparts there in February 1993.

American Detective was aired on ABC Television. It originally aired opposite NBC's Cheers and was later moved to Monday night, placed with Monday Night Football.

See also
Captain C. W. Jensen

References
 Brooks, Tim and Marsh, Earle, The Complete Directory to Prime Time Network and Cable TV Shows

External links 
 

American Broadcasting Company original programming
1991 American television series debuts
1993 American television series endings
Documentary television series about policing
Television series by Disney–ABC Domestic Television
Television series by MGM Television